The European Landowners' Organization (ELO) is a non-profit organization representing the interests of the owners and managers of rural land, and rural businesses, within the EU. The secretariat is based in Brussels.

History
The member-based organization was created in 1972, when the United Kingdom was joining the European Economic Community, as a European extension of the British Country Landowners' Association.

Purpose
Its more than 50 members form a network to better understand, explain and influence EU decisions. The ELO works not only to defend specific interests but also to plan a future of balanced development within Europe.

The organization aims to promote "a prosperous and attractive European countryside", based on fundamental values of sustainable land management, property rights and profitable rural businesses.

ELO policy recommendations are developed by upholding its values and by engaging with its members and European, national and international stakeholders.

ELO is a member of consultative committees and working groups within the EU, tackling different areas: innovation, environment, agriculture and rural development, forestry, climate action, renewable energy, resource efficiency, property rights and trade.

References

External links

CountrySide Magazine
A French study on the major NGOs where the ELO is mentioned

Organizations established in 1972
Landowners' organizations